Mozambique (formerly often spelled in English as in Portuguese, Moçambique) most commonly refers to the country in southeastern Africa. The term may also refer to:

Places
 the Island of Mozambique on the Nacala Coast, northern Mozambique, or the historic town of Moçambique thereon
 Mozambique, Seychelles, an island in Poivre Atoll, Seychelles
 the former province of Moçambique in Portuguese East Africa (now Nampula Province in Mozambique)
the Mozambique Channel separating the country of Mozambique from Madagascar

Art, entertainment, and media
Mozambique (film) a 1965 film
Mozambique (music), a vigorous style of Cuban music and dance
"Mozambique" (song), a song by Bob Dylan on his album Desire
"Mozambique", a song by Traffic from the album Far from Home

Other uses
Mozambique Drill, a technique used in pistol shooting